The What of Whom is the third self-released music cassette album by singer-songwriter Daniel Johnston, recorded in 1982.

The album was released on cassette in 1988 by Stress Records, made available in downloadable mp3 format by Emusic in 2000, and re-released on CD-R by Eternal Yip Eye Music in 2004. In between some songs, Daniel has little snippets of himself talking, or small skits of background noise concerning his every day life.

Background 
The album was recorded in August of 1982 between Johnston's Junior and Senior years studying at Kent State University, East Liverpool, Ohio .The album, like Songs of Pain and Don't Be Scared before it, was recorded in his parents' basement in West Virginia, where the 21 year old Johnston was living at the time. A guest writer for Atwood Magazine noted influences from Elvis Costello and The Beatles (particularly young John Lennon) on the track 'Man Obsessed.' During this same time Johnston recorded an unreleased tape known as 'Ugly Music' for his friend John Fair. The tape was largely made up of material written for Songs of Pain, but also included Don't Be Scared and What of Whom songs, as well as 3 unreleased songs.

Artwork 
The cover artwork is a drawing by Johnston of a woman's torso, inspired by Venus de Milo and Venus of Willendorf. The torso represents sex and the objectified, mystified, and dehumanized way women are portrayed in his lyrics and artwork.

Legacy 
Groovie Ghoulies included a cover of 'To Go Home' on their 1997 album Re-Animation Festival. In 1999 "Weird Paul" Petroskey included a cover of 'Man Obsessed' as a hidden track on his album Your Favorite Gum. Five years later, in 2004, Mercury Rev covered 'Blue Clouds' for The Late Great Daniel Johnston tribute album, and in 2006 M. Ward covered 'To Go Home' on his 'Post-War' album.

In 2010 when Douglas Wolk reviewed the album for Pitchfork as part of the 'Story of an Artist' box-set, he described both it and Don't Be Scared as 'lacking in quality control.' In December of 2012, Adam Stafford released a cover of 'Blue Clouds' recorded in 2009 on his digital album 'This Year Has Vanished.' In January of 2019, The Copyrights released their cover of 'To Go Home''' as part of their re-recorded version of Groovie Ghoulies's Re-Animation Festival.

In the months following Johnston's death, several retrospectives on his career were published. New York Times' '12 essential Daniel Johnston tracks' article written by David Peisner features the first two tracks from The What Of Whom . Atwood Magazine's retrospective called Man Obsessed 'A darkly comedic inversion of 60s beat era pop'.'' In 2020 Built to Spill covered 'Heart Mind and Soul' for their Daniel Johnston tribute album. When reviewing the album. Alison Alber (writing for Mxdwn) mentioned the song as an example of Johnston's lyrical talent.

Track listing

Release History

References 

Daniel Johnston albums
1982 albums
Albums recorded in a home studio
Self-released albums